Nothing Like This may refer to:
Nothing Like This (album), a 2010 album by Rascal Flatts
"Nothing Like This" (song), a 2016 song by Blonde and Craig David